Amir Teljigović (born 17 August 1968) is a Bosnian retired international footballer.

Club career
He started his career in 1988 playing with FK Proleter Zrenjanin in the Yugoslav Second League. In 1990 they won promotion to the Yugoslav First League.  In 1992, despite the break-up of SFR Yugoslavia, he stayed in Serbia and signed with FK Vojvodina, now playing in the First League of FR Yugoslavia.

In 1994, he moved to the South Korean K-League club Busan Daewoo Royals where he stayed for two seasons. After a short spell in Serbia with FK Mladost Apatin, he will join Swedish club Trelleborgs FF in 1997. In 1999, he moved to Cyprus and played with Apollon Limassol.

In 2000, he came back to Serbia to play with his former club Proleter, before ending his playing career playing with FK Mladi Radnik.

International career
Considering he was born in Sarajevo, Teljigović was called up and appeared in one match for Bosnia and Herzegovina, a World Cup qualification match against Croatia in 1996.

References

External sources

 
 Profile at Srbijafudbal

1968 births
Living people
Footballers from Sarajevo
Association football midfielders
Yugoslav footballers
Bosnia and Herzegovina footballers
Bosnia and Herzegovina international footballers
FK Proleter Zrenjanin players
FK Vojvodina players
Busan IPark players
FK Mladost Apatin players
Trelleborgs FF players
Apollon Limassol FC players
FK Mladi Radnik players
Yugoslav Second League players
Yugoslav First League players
First League of Serbia and Montenegro players
K League 1 players
Allsvenskan players
Cypriot First Division players
Second League of Serbia and Montenegro players
Bosnia and Herzegovina expatriate footballers
Expatriate footballers in Serbia and Montenegro
Bosnia and Herzegovina expatriate sportspeople in Serbia and Montenegro
Expatriate footballers in South Korea
Bosnia and Herzegovina expatriate sportspeople in South Korea
Expatriate footballers in Sweden
Bosnia and Herzegovina expatriate sportspeople in Sweden
Expatriate footballers in Cyprus
Bosnia and Herzegovina expatriate sportspeople in Cyprus
Bosniaks of Bosnia and Herzegovina